A limited geography model for the Book of Mormon is one of several theories by Latter Day Saint movement scholars that the book's narrative was a historical record of people in a limited geographical region, rather than of the entire Western Hemisphere as believed by some early and nearly all current Latter Day Saints.

These models, developed in an effort to reconcile claims in the Book of Mormon with archaeology and geography, have situated the book's events in South America, Mesoamerica, and the Great Lakes area. One popular LDS theory places the setting for the Book of Mormon in the vicinity of Mexico and Central America surrounding the Isthmus of Tehuantepec. Others recognize a setting among the mound builders as the book's original setting. This North American setting has gained support from some notable members of the LDS community, including LDS filmmaker Kieth Merrill. The mound builder setting parallels traditional settings of the Book of Mormon accepted during the 19th century, but is still a minority view in LDS academia.

These models have not changed the academic consensus outside the Latter Day Saint movement that the Book of Mormon is not an accurate description of ancient American history.

Background
The limited geography models are the result of a growing school of thought among Latter Day Saint scholars that for the text of the Book of Mormon to realistically be interpreted as a historical document, the events described therein must be limited to an area of several hundred square miles. Proponents of these theories find support in the text of the Book of Mormon, as well as the interpretation and correlation of archeological findings. However, as with all archaeological interpretations of the Book of Mormon, most LDS researchers believe that nothing has yet been found to conclusively link the events of the book with any particular geographical location.  There are significant challenges to the Central American setting, as the Hill Cumorah (in New York) and the remains of Zelph (the Naples Mound 8, in western Illinois) were found many thousands of miles away from Mesoamerica. Archaeological evidence supporting the Book of Mormon's "Mound-builder" literary setting is not interpreted by mainstream academia as proving the historicity or divinity of the work.

The Book of Mormon is regarded by mainstream historians and literary experts as a work of 19th century American literature, in the "Mound-builder" genre but not as history.

Limited geography and Book of Mormon population

The Book of Mormon describes a journey by a group of people led by a prophet named Lehi from the Old World to the New World in approximately 600 BC. The Book of Mormon also describes the journey of 2 other groups to America.  One group was the people of Mulek (supposed by Bible authors to have died), who was the son of Zedekiah. The group left Jerusalem within a few years of Lehi's departure, but was not known to the people of Lehi until some time between 323 and 130 BC. Another group described in great detail in the Book of Mormon, particularly in the constituent Book of Ether, is called the Jaredites.  According to the Book of Mormon, the Jaredites came from the Tower of Babel in barges and inhabited the Western Hemisphere until their complete destruction through civil war, which occurred after the people of Mulek arrived in the New World.  The only Jaredite to encounter the people of Mulek was named Coriantumr and he dwelt with them for "nine moons" before his death. The history of the Jaredites was reportedly recorded by a Jaredite prophet named Ether, whose record was abridged by the prophet Moroni (son of Mormon) many hundred years later and included in the Book of Mormon as the Book of Ether.

Given that the Book of Mormon clearly describes inhabitants of the New World long before Lehi's arrival, LDS scholars have long taken a critical view regarding the assumption that no other people were present in the New World at the time of Lehi's arrival.

In 1927, Janne M. Sjödahl stated that "students of the Book of Mormon should be cautioned against the error of supposing that all the American Indians are the descendants of Lehi, Mulek and their companions."
In 1938 a church study guide for the Book of Mormon stated that "the Book of Mormon deals only with the history and expansion of three small colonies which came to America, and it does not deny or disprove the possibility of other immigrations, which probably would be unknown to its writers."
From 1952 onward, LDS scholar Hugh Nibley repeatedly argued that the assumption that there were no other people present in the New World at the time of Lehi's arrival might be incorrect.
In 1980 Nibley, referring to archaeological evidence, stated that the assumption of an empty New World represented a "simplistic reading" of the Book of Mormon.
Early in the twentieth century RLDS (Reorganized Church of Jesus Christ of Latter Day Saints) members proposed a limited Mesoamerican geography for the Book of Mormon. By the middle of the twentieth century, most LDS authors shared the belief that the Book of Mormon events took place within a limited region in Mesoamerica, and that others were present on the continent at the time of Lehi's arrival. This geographical and population model was formally published in the official church magazine, The Ensign, in a two-part series published in September and October 1984. This was followed by a book on the subject by LDS anthropologist John L. Sorenson in 1985.

In the 1920s, LDS General Authority and historian B.H. Roberts questioned the assumption of a hemispheric geography and population model for the Book of Mormon. In his critical examination of the Book of Mormon, eventually published in 1985 under the title Studies of the Book of Mormon, Roberts states: 

[C]ould the people of Mulek and of Lehi … part of the time numbering and occupying the land at least from Yucatan to Cumorah … live and move and have their being in the land of America and not come in contact with other races and tribes of men, if such existed in the New World within Book of Mormon times? To make this seem possible the area occupied by the Nephites and Lamanites would have to be extremely limited, much more limited, I fear, than the Book of Mormon would admit our assuming.

A view supported by Hugh Nibley:

The overall picture reflects before all a limited geographical and cultural point of view—small localized operations, with only occasional flights and expeditions into the wilderness; one might almost be moving in the cultural circuit of the Hopi villages.

The proposal of a limited geography is coupled with the proposal that the American continents were already populated at the time of the arrival of Lehi's group. The presence of inhabitants on the American continents long before the arrival of Lehi's party is well supported by existing archaeological data. The exact date of arrival of these early inhabitants is still debated among archaeologists, with a common theory being an arrival via a land bridge in the Bering Strait approximately 14,000 years ago.

Matching the Book of Mormon model to existing geography
The acceptance of the limited geography model by LDS scholars is now supported by a growing body of work that attempts to apply a "flesh-and-blood" reality to the cultures in the Book of Mormon.

Unrelated to the geography but important to some modelers is current evidence of ancient writing. They surmise, there are only two regions in the New World showing the high degree of ancient civilization required by the text of the Book of Mormon.  One of these locations is centered in South America in the region once occupied by the Inca civilization. The other is centered in Mesoamerica in the region once occupied by the Maya and the Olmec civilizations. Of the two, only the civilizations in the Mesoamerican region are known to have had a sophisticated form of writing. One LDS researcher, however, points out that even though Central America bore a large population during the Book of Mormon time period, there is no evidence of a large population matching the description of Nephite civilization existing there. Therefore, "Mesoamerican settings are not more favorable towards the Book of Mormon demographically, than Joseph Smith's American Israelite setting among the mound builders." As to the written language of the Nephite people, it was anticipated that their writing "upon anything save it be upon plates must perish and vanish away ..."

The Limited Mesoamerican Geography Model has been critiqued, suggesting that it is not an adequate explanation for Book of Mormon geography and that the locations, events, and flora and fauna described in it do not precisely match. In response to one of these critiques in 1994, Sorenson reaffirmed his proposal for a limited Mesoamerican geographical setting.

Mesoamerican setting
According to a subset of LDS scholars investigating the field, the application of the Book of Mormon limited geography model to a Mesoamerican setting produces a "highly plausible match." LDS scholars use "contextual knowledge" in order to establish a plausible setting (not necessarily accepted by mainstream academia or other LDS) for the cultural events of the Book of Mormon within the context of known Mesoamerican historical settings. The goal is to determine places and times at which Book of Mormon events occurred that correlate with similar events in the Mesoamerican historical record .
Based on extensive textual analysis and comparison of the Book of Mormon limited geography model to existing geographical regions, time-lines and cultures, the majority of LDS scholars, so it has been claimed, agree that the Book of Mormon geography is centered in Mesoamerica around the Isthmus of Tehuantepec, in the area of current day Guatemala and the southern Mexico States of Tabasco, Chiapas, Oaxaca, Veracruz, and the surrounding area .

Existence of ancient system of writing
Support for the hypothesis of Mesoamerica as a plausible location for a limited Book of Mormon geography requires that the ancient inhabitants have a highly developed system of writing. Mesoamerica is the only area in the Americas where evidence survives of an ancient system of writing . There have been identified at least six pre-Christian era Mesoamerican systems of writing . Although much of this writing has been deciphered, there are still instances of ancient writing from these cultures that scholars have not yet been able to translate. However, the oral tradition of certain native people of "northern America" maintains the existence of an indigenous, pre-Columbian script. More than one LDS researcher has concluded that various characters from "North America's first indigenous script" resemble characters believed to have been copied from the Book of Mormon plates.

Directions
The Isthmus of Tehuantepec is bounded by a northern and a southern coast, whereas the "narrow neck" described in the Book of Mormon is said to be surrounded by a west sea and an east sea. Sorenson suggests that this is explained by understanding the manner in which ancient cultures label directions. He points out that the Israelites in Palestine defined their directions as though they were standing with their backs to the sea. The direction "sea" (seaward) denoted west while the direction "fore" (inland) denoted east. The direction south was denoted by "right hand" and the direction north by "left hand." In the case of Palestine, these directions correlated with the actual geography of the north-south coast . In the language used by the Maya, the word south meant "on the right hand" and north meant "on the left" . One researcher suggested that ancient Maya directions were set 45° different from our own. The Book of Mormon, however, leads us to ask how a colony of ancient Israelites would have coordinated directions outside Palestine.  It is important to note that Hebraic scholars disagree with Sorenson's generalized interpretation of Israelite coordinates. Sorenson is correct in pointing out that the expression "seaward" in Palestine commonly means west. "Sea" or "seaward" in Hebrew can substitute for "west" when referring to the local Mediterranean Sea. Joshua 1:4 reads, "… as far as the great sea [Mediterranean] toward the going down of the sun, shall be your border." However, Sorenson is incorrect in suggesting that Israelites outside of Palestine would have generally defined west standing with their backs to a sea. The Israelite coordinate system is based on the perceived movement of the heavenly quarters.  East is therefore defined not by facing inland from an arbitrary coast, but by standing before the general direction of the rising sun (מִזְרָח, Exodus 27:13, Deuteronomy 3:27, Joshua 11:3, Psalms 113:3). Facing sunrise, "before" is the same as east, the "right hand" directs south, the "left hand" directs north and "behind" becomes west (Joshua 12:3, Joel 2:20). "Place of sunset" (מַעֲרָב) properly defines Israelite west outside of Palestine (Psalms 103:12, Isaiah 43:5). There is in fact an instance in Hebrew scripture in which "from the sea" may be translated "from the south", possibly referring to the Arabian Sea (Psalms 107:3).  See also Encyclopedia Judaica, MIZRAH; SUN.

Position of seas
The Book of Mormon refers to two lands, a land northward and a land southward . The land northward was completely surrounded by water  and the land southward was nearly surrounded by water . Jacob, the brother of Nephi described the land southward as being an "isle of the sea": "... for the Lord has made the sea our path, and we are upon an isle of the sea" . One author notes that the Hebrew term translated "isle" can also mean "coast", "border", "region" or "habitable land" and does not exclusively mean island: e.g. Isaiah 20:6; 23:1-6,  The majority of references to seas refer to a sea east and west of the land northward and the land southward . The Isthmus of Tehuantepec borders the Gulf of Mexico on the north and the Pacific Ocean on the south.

The Old World Promised Land is bordered by inland bodies of water called "seas". The Book of Mormon does not indicate that its every mention of "sea" relates to an Oceanic body of water.

The "narrow" neck of land
The lateral Isthmus of Tehuantepec goes from east to west, bordering the Gulf of Mexico on the north (allegedly the Book of Mormon "east sea") and the Pacific Ocean on the south (allegedly the "west sea").  says that "it was only the distance of a day and a half's journey for a Nephite, on the line Bountiful and the land Desolation, from the east to the west sea" (Tehuantepec theorists contend that this means traveling south). The Tehuantepec scenario requires that the entire Bountiful – Desolation border be placed within "the small neck of land" (alleged to be the 125 mile wide Mesoamerican isthmus). The scenario also requires reinterpreting directions so that "the sea, on the west and on the east" of a geographic feature called "the narrow pass" can be construed to correspond to Oceans on the north and on the south. Coon points out that even if we interpret "the narrow pass" to be a passage within "the narrow neck", scripture nevertheless indicates a "sea" close by on either side of the "narrow pass ... on the west and on the east". Consolidating the "narrow pass" within the "small neck" (as in Olive’s moraine model) Coon further points out that mention "of the "narrow pass" or "neck" is repeatedly accompanied with essentially the same description: From the point of view of Nephites occupying lands to the south, the geographic feature is described as "the narrow pass which led into the land northward ..." or "the narrow neck which led into the land northward." From the point of view of Nephites occupying lands to the north, we read of "the narrow passage which led into the land southward" or "the narrow pass which led into the land southward." Coon notes that the entrance to the narrow pass, near the Bountiful border, was such a localized feature that scripture describes it as a "point". In addition to fortifying the land Bountiful this critical "point", needed to be secured. By comparison, the breadth of Bountiful is described as a "line". Coon concludes that the breadth of the narrow neck of land must have been smaller than the length of Bountiful and Desolation. "In fact", writes Coon, "we should expect that the width of the small neck was considerably smaller than the breadth of these lands. Tehuantepec is as wide as Florida! The narrow neck, it seems, was small enough to be blocked by a poisonous serpent epidemic during a time of drought.” Coon maintains that the "narrow neck of land" was small enough compared to the lands of Desolation and Bountiful, to be described as being "by" the borders of these lands. Olive's mound builder setting identifies the narrow neck with a moraine that is known to have divided New York's ancient Lake Tonawanda into western and eastern portions. This moraine (the Batavia moraine), situates according to Olive, "by the place where the sea [singular] divides the land [Desolation]"  which may or may not have been visible during Book of Mormon times.

 says that "they did fortify ... from the west sea, even unto the east; it being a day's journey for a Nephite, on the line which they had fortified ..." (traveling north according to the Tehuantepec theory). The Book of Mormon makes no mention of any swift means of communication, nevertheless LDS scholars argue that, on a fortified line, quick communication is essential and the speed "for a Nephite" might reasonably be faster than that of some other group . Also, this length of time likely referred to the speed of couriers, which John L. Sorenson has speculated might be as fast as  a day. Matthew Roper believes that part of the journey would be taken on the Coatzacoalcos River, which flows North into the Gulf of Mexico and covers nearly half the distance across the isthmus. This would account for the difference in time of travel; one day to travel with the current north but one and a half days traveling south, against the current.

The breadth of "Bountiful", according to Olive, Coon and Hamilton, is approximately the  distance from Batavia, New York, westward to the coast of Lake Erie – along the line of the Onondaga scarp which fails the scriptural requirement that 1.5 day stretch of land be to the east of the narrow neck. The "narrow neck of land" according to Olive is a narrow moraine near Batavia.

Effect on existing population with arrival of external groups
The Mesoamerican Limited Geography Model suggests that the introduction of a small, external population into the existing Mesoamerican population would initially show little evidence in the archaeological record . It is suggested by LDS scholars that certain cultural features spread out from the Mesoamerican area to surrounding regions over time after the arrival of external groups .

Determining plausible locations for cities and events
Some LDS scholars believe that the Tehuantapec model provides enough of a match with existing geography, ancient cultures and ruins, to propose plausible locations for certain Book of Mormon places and events. Critics, on the other hand, insist that the Tehuantepec model is fundamentally flawed.

"Waters of Mormon" and city "Jerusalem"
The "fountain of pure water" referred to as "the waters of Mormon" is stated to have been in "the land which was in the borders of Nephi.". Olive places "the waters of Mormon" near the eastern shore of Lake Erie, about 150 miles from scriptural Cumorah. Lake Atitlan is alleged by Tehuantepec isthmus advocates as a plausible candidate for these "waters" if the land of Nephi is assumed to be centered in the area of Kaminaljuyu (near Guatemala City). The lake is nine miles (14 km) long and four miles (6 km) wide. According to the Book of Mormon, the timber "city Zarahemla" "burned with fire", while the southern city called "Jerusalem" was covered by waters at the time of destruction associated with Jesus Christ's death.. Lake Atitlan is surrounded by volcanoes. As a result of volcanic activity, the level of the lake is known to have shifted very abruptly (up to 60 feet) during historical times. In 1985, Sorenson speculated that the city of Jerusalem was located adjacent to this lake and was submerged by such activity, although no evidence of a submerged city was evident at the time the statement was made . In recent years, submerged pre-Columbian ruins have been found in the depths of Lake Atitlan. Coon points out that unlike Stephens' Incidents of Travel in Central America, there is no explicit reference in the Book of Mormon to volcanoes or volcanism, and that the "great and terrible day" can be accounted for without "local volcanism" hypotheses. Except for the mention of defensive "walls of stone" (not necessarily hewn stone), there is no explicit mention of hewn stone structures or stone buildings, that could potentially become stone ruins, sunken or otherwise. The Book of Mormon explicitly mentions "houses ... cities ... temples ... synagogues ... sanctuaries" built of timber. Hence the fate of the city Zarahemala: "... there were exceedingly sharp lightnings ... And the city of Zarahemla did take fire."

Location of the final battles of the Lamanites and the Nephites
Several proponents of the Tehuantapec model have proposed that the final battles of the Lamanites and the Nephite civilizations occurred at the Cerro El Vigia ("Lookout Hill"), a 3000 foot (800 m) tall extinct volcano located in the northwestern section of the Sierra de los Tuxtlas mountain range in Mexico. The hill allegedly fits certain requirements (posed by Palmer) that Palmer argues would need to be met in order to qualify as the Hill Cumorah:
The presence of plains at the base of the hill able to accommodate large armies.
The hill must be of sufficient size that a million people could be "arrayed in battle" around its base.
The hill must be high enough that survivors who were wounded in battle would be able to hide safely at the top without being seen by the Lamanites below, but not so high that wounded men could not climb it at night . Sorenson suggests that, if this is the correct hill, then Mormon had once hidden the Nephite archive of records somewhere within it.

Moroni and the final resting place of the plates
Several Book of Mormon geography models conflict with the western New York location of Cumorah where Joseph Smith reported finding the golden plates. This has led to a recent argument promoted by some LDS apologists, known as the "Two Cumorahs" theory . The Book of Mormon states that some final battles of the Nephite people took place near "the narrow passage". Mesoamerican setting advocates seek to place this geographic feature in Central America . Others point out that there are more than one isthmus or narrow moraine in the vicinity of "scriptural Cumorah " – western New York.

In the Book of Mormon narrative, the Nephite historian Mormon states that he "hid up in the hill Cumorah all the records which had been entrusted to me by the hand of the Lord, save it were these few plates which I gave unto my son Moroni.". The "hill Cumorah" referred to by Mormon is the hill located near the scene of the final battle between the Nephites and the Lamanites. Moroni continues to record information on these plates as late as 35 years after they were given to him. Some LDS apologists suggest that the method by which the plates reached New York was that Moroni carried them there during this long interim . On this point, no Central, South American or Malay setting for the Book of Mormon is exactly limited, in that these settings require Moroni to have traveled thousands of miles beyond the confines of his homeland (and his warring brethren), to deposit the plates in a land whose soil had not gathered the dead of his people.

To support this assumption, it is postulated that Moroni buried the plates near the scene of the final battle and then returned 20 years later to retrieve them and add information to them before his final farewell, in which he states that his intention to "seal up these records" . The assumption that Moroni hid the plates at the time of the final battle is based upon , in which Moroni states "Therefore I will write and hide up the records in the earth; and whither I go it mattereth not." Continued reading of the text reveals that Moroni abridged the Book of Ether and added it to the record after making this statement. Moroni later writes "wherefore, I wander whithersoever I can for the safety of mine own life. Wherefore, I write a few more things, contrary to that which I had supposed; for I had supposed not to have written any more." There is no explicit mention in the Book of Mormon of Moroni either having hidden the plates at the time of the final battle or having returned to this location to add more to them years later.

LDS apologist Vincent Coon cites non-LDS archaeologist Salvatore Trento, who posits the possibility that Joseph Smith actually discovered buried metal tablets engraved with "weird markings".  Trento notes comparable discoveries in Northeastern America which Coon points out are not likely the result of a singular ancient individual traveling thousands of miles from Central or South America.

Great Lakes setting

Some LDS researchers have proposed a limited Great Lakes setting for the Book of Mormon . One of these proposals has the histories of the Jaredite, Nephite and Lamanite civilizations taking place in a small area of southern Ontario and western New York. According to Delbert Curtis, ]the seas surrounding the land are said to be Lakes Huron, Ontario, and Erie).

LDS scholars have given the following reasons for discounting some of these theories:
A lack of appropriate geographical features, such as highlands and lowlands. However, the limited Great Lakes setting proposed by Olive meets topographical requirements surprisingly well .
The presumed lack of seismic activity in the northeastern United States. Actually western New York is subject to strong anomalous earthquakes .
The presumption that snow and cold are not mentioned in the Book of Mormon – except in the instance where Nephi, after arriving in the Promised Land of America, described his previous visions to future generations "who should possess the land" Nephi's expression translated "... driven snow", which presumably his descendants could relate to, implies that Nephi had experienced something like a blizzard – snow carried by the wind into drifts (Shakespeare, William, Winter's Tale, Act 4, character: Autolycus).  Nephi's exact wording is without parallel in the Bible. It rarely snows in temperate Jerusalem. Jewish prophets were acquainted with the white-capped mountains of Lebanon to the north. Nephi's Promised Land description of the Tree of Life can be compared with Lehi's description of its fruit. In the wilderness, adjacent to the Red Sea, Lehi described the fruit of the Tree of Life to his family, but did not specifically liken its "whiteness" to snow. The Book of Mormon also describes severe "hail", a weather condition favored in temperate climates. The Hebrew word "barad" translated "hail", relates to a Semitic term for cold or become cold (ברד, The New Brown-Driver-Briggs-Gesenius Hebrew Aramaic Lexicon).

Beginning in the spring (the month of the "Abib", a critical stage of barley maturation), and continuing through the year, four seasons are required for keeping all of the ordinances of the Law of Moses. Tropical Mesoamerica experiences a wet and a dry season year round. There is presently no evidence of pre-Columbian barley in Central America. Evidence of barley cultivation in ancient northern American has been found near the Great Lakes . It may be concluded that Book of Mormon lands were subject to more than two seasons with no impediment to keeping the ordinances of Israel. Evidence indicates that winters were milder in western New York during Book of Mormon times. Even in modern times, humid, western New York occasionally experiences a heat index of 80– in the spring and early summer. 
Opponents of a limited Great Lakes setting say that the cultures of the ancient inhabitants of the area (mound builder) do not match the Book of Mormon narrative, even though North American peoples associated with these cultures, are known to have been accomplished metal workers, and to have made impressive works of earth, timber, rock, and plaster ("cement", see 19th century definition, Oxford Dictionary; Joseph Smith History 1:52), not unlike the constructions described in the Book of Mormon. Joseph Smith affirmed that at least some of the mound builders were the Nephites of the Book of Mormon.
In opposition to placing the setting for the Book of Mormon in lands near the Great Lakes (lands now occupied by the United States of America) it has been suggested that a feature as significant as Niagara Falls could not escape mention in the Book of Mormon had this been the area in which the civilizations described in it existed . However, in the limited Great Lakes setting proposed by Olive, Niagara Falls situate on a watery western extremity and would not have been encountered in any of the situations detailed in the abridged Nephite narrative. Olive points out that there were several cataracts along the northern escarpment, resulting from the overflow of old Lake Tonawanda (believed to be the Book of Mormon's land-dividing sea). More than one of these may have rivaled the falls of Niagara . The land northward in Olive's Book of Mormon settings certainly qualifies as a land of "many water, rivers and fountains" (Mormon 6:4). It may well be asked why Niagara Falls should have received so much attention.

Particularly troublesome to the Mesoamerica geography hypothesis, is the fact LDS scripture places Cumorah, a land which the Book of Mormon says is "in a land of many waters, rivers, and fountains", near New York's Finger Lakes, just south of Lake Ontario (Church History maps 1, 2 and 3 accompanying the Doctrine and Covenants). Based on LDS scripture and statements of early church members, several General Authorities of the church have publicly opposed the idea that Cumorah is in Mexico or Central America.

It is clear that the Book of Mormon "land northward" has a limiting northern boundary. The land is likely bounded on the north by the exceedingly large "waters of Ripliancum", whereas Southern Mexico is open on the north to the continent.
In counties near Lake Ontario, E.G. Squier, commissioned by the Smithsonian Institution, documented the remains of numerous earth and timber "castles" and "towns" constructed by the indigenous peoples of western New York .  With the expansion of modern civilization, aboriginal monuments and antiquities have vanished from the New York landscape.

From written statements made by Joseph Smith, it may be concluded that Book of Mormon peoples or their descendants migrated from "the lake country of America" (near Lake Ontario) to Mexico and Central America. There is no known statement by Joseph Smith, however, which explicitly asserts that Book of Mormon lands are to be found in Mexico and Central America.

During the fall of 1842, Joseph Smith found it necessary to go into hiding. During this time, several anonymous and contradictory articles, doting on the discoveries of John Lloyd Stephens, were published in the church's Times and Seasons newspaper. Joseph Smith thought highly of Stephens' bestseller but only made minor mention of it in his "AMERICAN ANTIQUITIES" editorial (July 15, 1842). The anonymous "ZARAHEMLA" article (October 1, 1842), on the other hand, alleges that the Central American ruins of Quirigua (now known to date more recent than Book of Mormon times) are none other than the ruins of Zarahemla or some other Book of Mormon city.  This sensational piece was published in the same issue as a signed letter to the church from Joseph Smith (in hiding). Inferred in Joseph Smith's epistle (dated September 6, 1842) is the Finger Lakes location of Cumorah. A careful study of the Book of Mormon shows that Zarahemla cannot be thousands of miles distance from the land Cumorah.

It is unlikely that things as common as monkeys (translated "apes" in the KJV) and palm trees could escape mention in the Book of Mormon had Mesoamerica been the area in which the civilizations describes in it existed.  In the Book of Mormon, the only reference to anything like a jaguar is "leopard", and this occurs only in quotations from the biblical prophet Isaiah. On the other hand, "lions" (possibly cougars) are mentioned more than once in Nephite history.

Contrary to several artistic depictions, there is no explicit reference to any temple or pyramid made of hewn stone in New World Book of Mormon lands. We read that the Nephites constructed their temples from timber. Hugh Nibley remarked:

In the Nephites we have a small and mobile population dispersed over a great land area, living in quickly built wooden cities, their most ambitious structures being fortifications of earth and timbers occasionally reinforced with stones. The vast majority of Book of Mormon people, almost all of them in fact, are eligible for the title of "migrating and nomadic" peoples. We have seen that the Lamanites were a slothful predatory lot on the whole, and that even the Nephites were always "wanderers in a strange land.

The Book of Mormon is a history of a related primitive church, and one may well ask what kind of remains the Nephites would leave us from their more virtuous days. A closer approximation to the Book of Mormon picture of Nephite culture is seen in the earth and palisade structures of the Hopewell and Adena culture areas than in the later stately piles of stone in Mesoamerica.

By comparison, there are numerous references to buildings made of hewn stone in the Old Testament. Mexico and Central America are renowned for stone ruins.

A place of inheritance by a west sea:

The Book of Mormon indicates that there was a western sea near the place of the American land of "first inheritance". (Alma 22:28)  There is nothing in the Book of Mormon indicating that this west sea was saltwater. The biblical word "yam", translated "sea", does not necessarily mean ocean. An early Mormon document in the handwriting of Frederick G. Williams speculates that Lehi's company "sailed in a southeast direction and landed on the Continent of South America in Chili [Chile] thirty degrees south latitude." This document greatly influenced a tradition that Lehi's family voyaged across the Arabian Sea, the Indian Ocean, and the vast Pacific Ocean. Twentieth Century LDS Church authorities, however, called the Williams document into question. The idea that the "west sea" of the Book of Mormon is the Pacific Ocean has, nevertheless, persisted in localized Central American, South American and exaggerated hemispheric settings for the Book of Mormon.

Mesoamerican setting advocate John E. Clark writes that all seas that bordered New World Book of Mormon lands "had to be the Pacific and Atlantic oceans ..." This statement is without clear scriptural support. Citing Alma 22:28, Clark alleges that "Lehi arrived from the Old World across the west sea". Great Lakes, and American Heartland setting advocates point out that this verse (cited by Clark), does not in fact say that Lehi voyaged across "the west sea". Clark alleges that the designations of west and east seas in the Book of Mormon "... are tied to ... original arduous journeys across oceans and the receding direction of their [the voyaging immigrant's] forfeited homeland."  But LDS scripture does not clearly identify "the waters of the great deep", "the great waters" or "the many waters" that Book of Mormon peoples voyaged across, with either of the seas immediately west or east of the lands of Zarahemla and Nephi. Clark's broad oceanic reference frame(s) seems inconsistent with the clearly local designation of "the sea on the west and on the east" of a terrestrial location "by the narrow pass ...". It can only be concluded, based on LDS scripture, that the American land of "first inheritance" extended to and included a place by the shore of a sea that situated west relative to the land of Nephi. To allege that all Book of Mormon seas are oceans is to make extrapolations beyond what the scripture actually states. The logic that sea = ocean, fails in the case of many biblical verses that refer to a "sea" or "the sea". Even "the great sea" (the Mediterranean, Numbers 34:6) bordering the biblical Promise Land, is essentially an inland body of water.

Rejecting hemispheric settings and accepting the scriptural location of Cumorah (D&C 128:20), LDS authors Olive, May and others, have concluded that the "many waters" crossed by Lehi's family involved the Atlantic Ocean. This view is clearly at odds with the Indian and Pacific Ocean tradition alleged in sources like the Williams document. A prophetic vision recorded in the Book of Mormon describes how "a man among the Gentiles" was seen navigating "the many waters". The reference to "the many waters" in this instance, is unequivocally interpreted by LDS to mean the Atlantic Ocean, and the implicit descriptions (in the scripture) of events in colonial American history, seems to support this conclusion.

The scenario advanced by Heartland and Great Lakes setting advocates considers that events at Jerusalem and teetering family relations, had made it unwise for Lehi's family to flee to the populated Mediterranean coast. The prospect of sailing to another land of promise by way of the Mediterranean was therefore out of the question. In an effort to avoid adversaries, Lehi's family fled into the southern desert, eventually arriving at an isolated location on the southeastern shore of the Arabian Peninsula. There they constructed a ship. Currents and seasonal winds at this location could have carried them to the coast of Africa and southward. There may have been more than thirty individuals in Lehi's company at this point. They would have had only so much stowage aboard their vessel for food and fresh water. The preferred route to the land of promise would have been one that would stay within easy reach of a coastline (food and much needed fresh water) most of the voyage. After "many days" at sea, they confronted a fearsome tempest (proposed to have occurred near Africa's horn). Thereafter, with enough fresh water and supplies stored on board, they crossed over to the Western Hemisphere along the shorter and more direct route between the Old World and the New World – assisted by the prevailing winds and equatorial currents of the Atlantic. Still aided by currents and winds, they sailed along American coasts and island chains until they arrived near the Gulf of Mexico. At this point the opinions of Olive and May diverge as to the final landing of Lehi.

Favoring a setting more localized near the Great Lakes, Olive writes that Lehi's company were directed by divine guidance across the Gulf of Mexico and up interconnected North American rivers such as the Mississippi, Ohio and other navigable ancient water ways, to within a short distance of the Book of Mormon's "west sea" or "west sea, south" – the freshwater Great Lake Erie (according to Olive). Both May and Olive agree that the northern arrivals of other ancient peoples in the Book of Mormon occurred by way of the Atlantic Ocean and St. Lawrence Seaway.

Joseph Smith was open to the possibility that Book of Mormon peoples migrated from lands as far north as present-day Quebec to Mexico and Central America, but clearly placed the arrival of the Jaredites in the region of "the lake country of America" (near Lake Ontario). Non-Mormon Josiah Priest, whose written work Joseph Smith editorialized, explicitly associated the title "lake country" with the Great Lakes region of America.

South American setting
A commonly held belief among the LDS for many years was that Lehi's group landed on the coast of Chile. This is supported by a record written in 1836 by Frederick G. Williams which suggests that Joseph Smith once stated that Lehi "landed on the continent of South America, in Chile, thirty degrees, south latitude." In the mid-1970s, several books were published by LDS researchers that proposed this geographical model .

A booklet published in 1882 by Franklin D. Richards made the claim that this information had been received by revelation through Joseph Smith.

Challengers of the limited geography model use this statement, along with the teachings of early Mormon missionaries supporting the idea of a landing in Chile, as evidence that the widespread belief in the hemispheric geography model was based upon a revelation through Joseph Smith, and that any information to the contrary constitutes "apologetic denial" . In addition, the story of Zelph is used to support the idea the Joseph Smith promoted a hemispheric geography for the Book of Mormon.
LDS scholars point out that in the earlier document authored by Frederick G. Williams, that the words "Lehi's Travels" and "Revelation to Joseph the Seer" do not appear in this text as they do in the subsequent 1882 publication .

A paper authored by LDS affiliated research group FARMS notes that the document authored by Frederick G. Williams "does not attribute the statement to Joseph Smith and, although Richards follows closely the Williams account, he gives no source for the statement or the title. There is no known earlier historical evidence associating this specific statement with Joseph Smith."

The claim of a landfall in Chile may have actually originated with Orson Pratt, who often included the Chile landing hypothesis in his writings and said that "this view was actually based upon his own inference from the Book of Mormon text" . In a talk given in 1872, Pratt described Lehi's group as "landing on the western coast of what is now called South America. As near as we can judge from the description of the country contained in this record the first landing place was in Chili, not far from where the city of Valparaiso now stands" . Pratt's opinions were incorporated into the geographical footnotes that he added into the 1879 edition of the Book of Mormon .

See also
Heartland Model
Proposed Book of Mormon geographical setting
Historical authenticity of the Book of Mormon
Archaeology and the Book of Mormon
Zelph#Zelph and the question of Book of Mormon geography

Notes

References

.
.
.
.
.
.
.
.
.
.
.
.
.
.
.
.
.
.
.
.
.
.
.
.
.

Further reading
 

Archaeology of the Americas
Limited geography model
Book of Mormon studies
Mesoamerican archaeology
Mormonism-related controversies